The Tainan City Hakka Assembly Hall of Culture is a cultural center in South District, Tainan, Taiwan.

History
The construction of the cultural center was completed and opened in 2010.

Architecture
The building was designed with Hakka architectural style. Its main entrance is designed with wooden sign and lanterns with pattern.

Exhibitions
The center exhibits various Hakka-related artifacts, such as crafts, foods and architecture. It also includes the history of Hakka people and culture.

Transportation
The center is accessible within walking distance southwest of Tainan Station of Taiwan Railways.

See also
 List of tourist attractions in Taiwan

References

External links
 

2010 establishments in Taiwan
Cultural centers in Tainan
Event venues established in 2010